Gareth Wyn Williams, Baron Williams of Mostyn,  (5 February 1941 – 20 September 2003), was a Welsh barrister and Labour politician who was Leader of the House of Lords, Lord President of the Council and a member of the Cabinet from 2001 until his sudden death in 2003.

Early life
Williams was born near Prestatyn, in North Wales, a son of Albert Thomas Williams and his wife Selina, née Evans. He was educated at Rhyl Grammar School and at Queens' College, Cambridge.

Legal career
He had an outstanding legal career. Called to the bar at Gray's Inn in 1965, he took silk in 1978, was a Recorder from 1978, a Deputy High Court Judge, 1986-92, the Leader of the Wales and Chester Circuit, 1987–89, and a Member of the Bar Council, 1986-92 (Chairman, 1992).

Political career
He was created a life peer on 20 July 1992 as Baron Williams of Mostyn, of Great Tew in the County of Oxfordshire, and became an opposition spokesman in the House of Lords on Legal Affairs, and later Northern Ireland. After Labour's election victory he was appointed a Home Office minister, and in 1999 became Attorney General for England and Wales and Northern Ireland. He was appointed Leader of the House of Lords in 2001, initially with the sinecure office of Lord Privy Seal, for which Lord President of the Council was substituted in 2003.

Reputation among his colleagues
As part of the celebrations to mark the fiftieth anniversary of the Life Peerages Act, Lord Williams was voted by the current members of the House of Lords as the outstanding life peer since the creation of the life peerage. In his book A View from the Foothills Chris Mullin wrote that he thought that Gareth Williams was most likely to succeed Derry Irvine as Lord Chancellor; the position was next filled  by Charles Falconer.

Personal life
Williams married Pauline Clarke in 1962, and they had three children. They divorced, and he then married Veena M. Russell in 1994, and by her had one daughter, Imogen. He died from a heart attack at his home in Evenlode, Gloucestershire on 20 September 2003, aged 62, and was buried at St Michael and all Angels Church in Great Tew, Oxfordshire.

References

Bibliography
 Burke's Peerage & Baronetage (106th edition, 1999) edited by Charles Mosley

External links
 "Interview: Lord Williams" - Guardian Unlimited Politics interview with Lord Williams by Julian Glover, dated Friday, 28 June 2002, giving the peer's views on reform of the House of Lords
 Profile, Dictionary of Welsh Biography. Accessed 30 January 2023.

|-

|-

|-

|-

|-

1941 births
2003 deaths
People from Prestatyn
20th-century Welsh lawyers
20th-century Welsh politicians
21st-century Welsh politicians
Alumni of Queens' College, Cambridge
Attorneys General for England and Wales
Attorneys General for Northern Ireland
Burials in Oxfordshire
Labour Party (UK) life peers
Leaders of the House of Lords
Lord Presidents of the Council
Lords Privy Seal
Members of Gray's Inn
Members of the Privy Council of the United Kingdom
Northern Ireland Government ministers
20th-century King's Counsel
Welsh King's Counsel
Welsh barristers
Welsh socialists
Life peers created by Elizabeth II